Akio Kanemoto (born 9 April 1945) is a Japanese professional golfer.

Kanemoto played on the Japan Golf Tour, winning three times.

Professional wins (4)

Japan Golf Tour wins (3)

Other wins (1)
1978 Mizuno Open

External links

Japanese male golfers
Japan Golf Tour golfers
1945 births
Living people